The South American Championship 1959 was a football tournament held in Argentina, and won by Argentina with Brazil as runner-up. Colombia and Ecuador withdrew from the tournament. Pelé from Brazil was named best player of the tournament and was the top scorer with 8 goals.

Venues

Squads

Final round

Result

Goalscorers

With eight goals, Pelé of Brazil is the top scorer in the tournament. In total, 86 goals were scored by 36 different players, with only one of them credited as own goal.

8 goals
 Pelé
6 goals
 José Aveiro
5 goals
 Paulo Valentim
 Miguel Angel Loayza
4 goals
 Rubén Héctor Sosa
3 goals

 Juan José Pizzuti
 Oreste Corbatta
 Raúl Belén
 Didi
 Cayetano Ré
 Héctor Demarco
 José Sasía
 Vladas Douksas

2 goals

 Pedro Eugenio Callá
 Pedro Waldemar Manfredini
 Máximo Alcócer
 Juan Soto Mura
 Leonel Sánchez
 Mario Soto
 Silvio Parodi
 Juan Joya
 Juan Seminario
 Carlos Borges
 Guillermo Escalada

1 goal

 Vladislao Cap
 Ausberto García
 Ricardo Alcón
 Chinesinho
 Luis Hernán Álvarez
 Mario Moreno
 Tovar
 Ildefonso Sanabria
 Óscar Gómez Sánchez
 Domingo Pérez
 Víctor Guaglianone

Own goal
 Víctor Benítez (playing against Argentina)

Team of the Tournament

References

External links

 South American Championship 1959 at RSSSF

 
1959, Argentina
Championship (Argentina), 1959
1959
Football in Buenos Aires
1959 in Argentine football
March 1959 sports events in South America
April 1959 sports events in South America
Sports competitions in Buenos Aires
1950s in Buenos Aires